In filmmaking, external rhythm, also called cutting rhythm, is established by the duration of the shots that make up a scene. Lengthening or shortening the duration of the shots establishes a rhythmic pattern that can complement or contrast with the internal rhythm and content of a scene or sequence. 

The kinds of transitions (e.g., cut, fade, dissolve, wipe) used from shot to shot or from scene to scene also affect the nature of the cutting rhythm.

References 

Film production
Film editing